Robert Frank Fleck better known as Robbie (born 17 July 1975 in Cape Town) is a former rugby union footballer who played at centre for South Africa. He is also the current head coach of the  team.

He made his international debut in the Tour of the UK & Ireland in 1998 and went on to make his test debut in 1999 against Italy.

He played for Bath Rugby in the English Premiership for a number of seasons.

Fleck attended Wynberg Boys' High School and Diocesan College in Cape Town.

At Bishops College Fleck played for their First XV in the same team alongside Herschelle Gibbs and Selborne Boome.

References

External links

scrum.com statistics
Signs for Bath

1975 births
Living people
Alumni of Diocesan College, Cape Town
South African rugby union players
South Africa international rugby union players
Western Province (rugby union) players
Stormers players
Alumni of Wynberg Boys' High School
Rugby union players from Cape Town
Rugby union centres